Oaks Christian School (OCS) is a co-educational, college-preparatory, non-denominational Christian school serving grades 5–12. The school was established in 2000. As of the 2019–20 school year, total student enrollment is approximately 1,400 students. Approximately three-quarters of these students are enrolled in high school (grades ), while the remainder comprise the middle school population (grades 5–8).

History
In 1997,  in a Westlake Village industrial park were purchased for the original campus. Oaks Christian School opened in 2000 to approximately 160 high school students and 40 middle school students. By the year 2002, most of the school and campus infrastructure had been completed, with the exception of the Bedrosian Pavilion, a performing arts facility completed in 2007. Surrounded by the Four Seasons Hotel and the Dole Food Company headquarters to the east, the Ventura Freeway to the south, and a large industrial park to the north, only one property lies contiguous to the campus. That seven-acre property became available in 2007, allowing for expansion.

In the 2009–10 school year, Oaks Christian opened its new middle school facility on the adjacent property. In 2014-15, the Academy V program for fifth grade students was launched.

As of the 2019–20 school year, Oaks Christian was scheduled to open a new on-site student dormitory to offer both 5- and 7-day/week boarding options. Additionally, the opening of the  Idea Lab (Innovation Design Engineering and Aeronautics) will offer students a jump start into careers focused on STEM career paths. Admission is competitive (59% acceptance rate), based on a variety of criteria ranging from primary school grades, Independent School Entrance Examination (ISEE) score, a personal interview, essays, and extracurricular interests.

Academics
Oaks Christian School is accredited by the Western Association of Schools and Colleges, the National Association of Independent Schools, as well as the Southern Association of Colleges and Schools. The average class size is 17 students. Fifty-one percent of the faculty hold advanced degrees, and 100% of the student body is admitted to colleges and universities. Among first-year students admitted to the University of Southern California, OCS is one of most-represented independent high schools.

Athletics
Oaks Christian School teams are nicknamed the Lions. The school is a member of the CIF Southern Section (CIF-SS) and competes in the Marmonte League. OCS sponsors 48 athletic teams across 26 sports. As of the 2019–20 school year, OCS holds a total of 49 CIF-SS championships (including six consecutive section titles in football in the 2000s), five CIF-State titles, 165 league championships, two Gatorade State Players of the Year, and one Gatorade National Player of the Year.

Since its inception, Oaks Christian has gained national prominence with its football team. The football program has developed numerous players who have been recruited for NCAA Division I programs and have played in the National Football League.

The Lions boys' and girls' track and field teams combined for five CIF-SS championships between 2014 and 2019.

Oaks Christian girls' water polo won its first CIF-SS championship in 2019 under Jack Kocur, who at the time also coached the Pepperdine Waves men's water polo team and was an assistant with the U.S. men's national team.

Notable alumni

Alex Bachman, professional football player
Phil Bickford, professional baseball player
Maya Brady, college softball player
Zach Charbonnet, college football player
Jimmy Clausen, professional football player
Colin Ford (born 1996), actor
Max Heidegger (born 1997), American-Israeli professional basketball player 
Dree Hemingway (born 1987), model
Malcolm Jones, professional football player
Cameron Judge, professional football player
Cassius Marsh, professional football player
Casey Matthews, professional football player
Nick Montana, college football player
Chris Owusu, professional football player
Francis Owusu, professional football player
Colby Parkinson, professional football player
Jordan Payton, professional football player
Michael Pittman Jr., professional football player
Sofia Richie, model and fashion designer
Preston Strother, actor
Kayvon Thibodeaux, professional football player
Marc Tyler, professional football player
Peter Weber, television personality

References

External links

2007 Oaks Christian High School Educator of Distinction (National Society of High School Scholars)

Christian schools in California
Private high schools in Los Angeles County, California
Private middle schools in Los Angeles County, California
Private preparatory schools in California
Westlake Village, California
Schools accredited by the Western Association of Schools and Colleges
Educational institutions established in 2000
2000 establishments in California